Golmaal is an Indian comedy film series directed by Rohit Shetty, with four installments to date, the first three produced by Dhilin Mehta, the fourth by Shetty and Sangeeta Ahir and the fifth which is a spin off is produced by Shetty with Bhushan Kumar. The first film Golmaal: Fun Unlimited released in 2006 and was followed by 3 direct sequels:Golmaal Returns (2008), Golmaal 3 (2010) and Golmaal Again (2017). All four films starred Ajay Devgn, Arshad Warsi, Tusshar Kapoor, Sanjay Mishra, Vrajesh Hirjee and Mukesh Tiwari, with Shreyas Talpade, Ashwini Kalsekar and Murali Sharma appearing in three and Kareena Kapoor and Kunal Khemu appearing in two. The series also has a spin off named Cirkus (film).

Golmaal is now the ninth-highest-grossing film series in Bollywood. The film series has been described as a screwball comedy franchise. This is the fifth Indian film franchise to have four installments after CID 999 Franchise, CBI, Major Mahadevan Franchise and Raaz Series and the first to have five installments. 

An animated version of the film series named Golmaal Jr. was released for with three central characters: Madhav, Gopal and Lucky.

A spin-off film Cirkus, story before Golmaal Again was released on 23rd December 2022.

Films

Golmaal: Fun Unlimited (2006)

Friends Gopal, Lucky, Madhav and Laxman often dupe gullible people out of their money. Hilarity ensues when they target an elderly couple and simultaneously try wooing their beautiful neighbour.

Golmaal Returns (2008)

Gopal, who lives with his wife, Ekta, gets stuck in a yacht for a night after he saves an attractive young woman. Ekta suspects him of having an affair and decides to uncover the truth.

Golmaal 3 (2010)

Cupid strikes when Pritam, a single father, comes across his college sweetheart, Geeta, in Goa. However, when their respective children go at war with each other, the two find it difficult to reunite.

Golmaal Again!!! (2017)

Five orphan men return to the orphanage they grew up in to attend their mentor's funeral. However, they encounter the ghost of their childhood friend, Khushi, and help her attain salvation.

Cirkus (2022)

A scientist separate two sets of identical twins to find the conflict b/w nature Vs nurture. However, years later the twins come close and creates confusion.

It was revealed in the upcoming film Cirkus trailer released in December 2022, that film is set in 1960's and it would be a prequel to the fourth film of Golmaal series. In the trailer five kids was standing in front of "Jamnadas Orphanage" and telling their names - Gopal, Madhav and Laxman (2 kids), while the fifth kid is mute and trying to tell his name is Lucky.

Phir Golmaal (TBA) 
After the release of the fourth installment, director Shetty is interested in the fifth part of the franchise. He said, after getting a right script there will definitely be another installment. Actor Ajay Devgn also shows interest to return to next part. It is also reported that Kareena Kapoor might return for the next installment. After the release of the "Aankh Marey" music video from Ranveer Singh and Sara Ali Khan's Simmba, speculations of a fifth installment of the Golmaal franchise further strengthened. In the video, the four main actors, including Arshad Warsi and Tusshar Kapoor, are seen at the end of the holding up their hands to denote the number "5." Finally, on November 7, 2021, Rohit announced that the fifth film of Golmaal series will be called Phir Golmaal. He also announced on that same day that it will be about Gopal, Madhav, Laxman, Lucky, and their new friend, who is named Vicky solving a case of them being accused of a murder as they keep on getting into trouble while solving it.

Cast and characters 
This table lists the main characters who appear in the Golmaal Franchise.

Additional crew and production details

Release and revenue

Animated series

An animated series Golmaal Jr. based on the characters from film series premiered on Sonic Nickelodeon on 13 May 2019.

References

External links
 
 
 
 

Indian film series
2000s Hindi-language films
2010s Hindi-language films
Comedy film series
Films adapted into television shows